Team Valley is a trading estate located in Gateshead. It is home to the Retail World retail park, with many large, international companies based in the area's trading estate. In 2017, there were approximately 700 companies on the estate, employing approximately 20,000 people.

The residential area known as the Teams is adjacent to Dunston.

History

In the 1930s, the Government decided to spend nearly £2 million on this part of Gateshead, establishing the Team Valley Trading Estate as a well-planned industrial environment. The architect in charge was William Holford, with Hugh Beaver as chief engineer.

It included a central headquarters, now used by English Partnerships, a bank, post office, and some modestly scaled industrial buildings, as well as some smaller industrial units for start-up ventures.

Work on the estate began in May 1936, and the first factory opened in the October of that year. The construction, which was undertaken by Wimpey Construction, took several years, and was completed in 1938.

The estate was officially opened by King George VI on 22 February 1939.

The southern end used of the Team Valley was the former location of the National Coal Board's regional headquarters. However, following the closure of the mines in the area, this was replaced by a Safeway supermarket (now Sainsbury's).

The River Team runs directly through the centre of the trading estate, hidden in a culvert.

Transport

To the east, the Team Valley is bordered by the East Coast Main Line – the main railway line between London, York, Newcastle upon Tyne and Edinburgh. Until 1952, the area was served by a rail station at Low Fell.

Currently, the nearest rail station is  Dunston as well as the Tyne & Wear Metro being accessible at Gateshead Interchange.

Local bus company Go North East serve Team Valley with their regular 93 and 94 Gateshead loop services.  Nexus subsidises peak-time services that include: 90, 91, 929, 933, 937, 939 and 941.

References

Sources

 

Business parks of England
Economy of Tyne and Wear
Geography of Tyne and Wear
Industrial parks in the United Kingdom